Thomas Pradzynski (29 November 1951 – 21 December 2007) was a Polish painter.  Born in Łódź in 1951, he attended the Lycée Français in Warsaw, where he received a master's degree in sociology and economics.

He and his wife, Joanna, moved to Paris in 1977, where he became known for his realistic Parisian street scenes.  At the time of his death, he lived in Montmartre.  He was murdered in December 2007 in a road rage incident while he was walking with his wife in Paris.

Pradzynski's work has been showcased at exhibitions around the world, including New York City, Germany, Japan, and California.

References

Other reading
 Thomas Pradzynski biography from the Doubletake Gallery

1951 births
2007 deaths
20th-century Polish painters
20th-century Polish male artists
21st-century Polish painters
21st-century male artists
Polish people murdered abroad
People murdered in Paris
Polish male painters
2007 murders in France
2007 in Paris
December 2007 events in France
2000s murders in Paris